Laura Verlinden is a Belgian actress. She was born in 1984 and studied at the Lemmensinstituut in Mechelen. She became known as an actress in the television series The Emperor of Taste (De smaak van De Keyser). She then acted in the films Le Tout Nouveau Testament (Brand New Testament) and De Laatste Zomer (The Last Summer).

Verlinden played a supporting role in Michael Haneke's 2017 film Happy End. She received the Magritte Award for Best Supporting Actress for her role as a teacher in Un monde (Playground).

References 

1984 births
Living people
Belgian actresses
Magritte Award winners